The Four Great Books of Song was compiled by a team of scholars during the Song dynasty (960–1279). The term was coined after the last book (Cefu Yuangui) was finished during the 11th century. The four encyclopedias were published and intended to collect the whole knowledge of the new state.

The four books are:
 The Taiping Yulan is a general-purpose leishu encyclopedia.
 The Taiping Guangji is a collection of deities, fairies, ghost stories and theology.
 The Wenyuan Yinghua is an anthology of poetry, odes, songs and other writings.
 The Cefu Yuangui is a leishu encyclopedia of political essays, autobiographies, memorials and decrees.

See also
 Chinese classic texts

References

Chinese classic texts
Chinese encyclopedias
Song dynasty

Leishu
Series of Chinese books